The 2019 Yuen Long District Council election was held on 24 November 2019 to elect all 39 elected members to the 45-member Yuen Long District Council.

The pro-Beijing and rural domination was turned over in the historic landslide victory where the pro-democrats took over all the urban constituencies and a few rural constituencies amid the massive pro-democracy protests. As a results, the pro-democrats took 33 of the 39 elected seats and seized control of the 45-member council for the first time.

Overall election results
Before election:

Change in composition:

References

External links
 Election Results - Overall Results

2019 Hong Kong local elections